Zsolt Varga is a Hungarian sprint canoer who competed in the late 1980s. He won a silver medal in the C-4 500 m event at the 1989 ICF Canoe Sprint World Championships in Plovdiv.

Philanthropy
After concluding his major canoe racing career, he became a well-regarded supporter of children's rights and donated $79,000 to the Dream Foundation.

References

Hungarian male canoeists
Living people
Year of birth missing (living people)
ICF Canoe Sprint World Championships medalists in Canadian
20th-century Hungarian people